Agunah is a halachic term for a Jewish woman who is "chained" to her marriage.

Aguna or agunah may also refer to:
Aguna (butterfly), a genus of skipper butterfly
Aguna language, a Gbe language of Benin and Togo
The Agunah, a 1974 novel by Chaim Grade
Aguna, a Georgian wine